Bertrand competition is a model of competition used in economics, named after Joseph Louis François Bertrand (1822–1900). It describes interactions among firms (sellers) that set prices and their customers (buyers) that choose quantities at the prices set.  The model was formulated in 1883 by Bertrand in a review of Antoine Augustin Cournot's book Recherches sur les Principes Mathématiques de la Théorie des Richesses (1838) in which Cournot had put forward the Cournot model. Cournot's model argued that each firm should maximise its profit by selecting a quantity level and then adjusting price level to sell that quantity. The outcome of the model equilibrium involved firms pricing above marginal cost; hence, the competitive price. In his review, Bertrand argued that each firm should instead maximise its profits by selecting a price level that undercuts its competitors' prices, when their prices exceed marginal cost. The model was not formalized by Bertrand; however, the idea was developed into a mathematical model by Francis Ysidro Edgeworth in 1889.

Underlying assumptions of Bertrand competition
Considering the simple framework, the underlying assumptions that the Bertrand model makes is as follows:

 there are  firms competing in the market that produce homogenous goods; that is, identical products;
 the marginal cost is symmetric,  ; 
 it is a static game; firms simultaneously set price, without knowing the other firm’s decision; and
 firms don't have a capacity constraint; that is, each firm has the capability to produce enough goods to meet market demand. 
Furthermore, it is intuitively deducible, when considering the law of demand of firms' competition in the market:

 the firm that sets the lowest price will acquire the whole the market; since, product is homogenous and there is no cost of switching for the customers; and
 if the price set by the firms is the same, they will serve the market equally, .

The Bertrand duopoly equilibrium 
Why is the competitive price a Nash equilibrium in the Bertrand model? First, if both firms set the competitive price with price equal to marginal cost (unit cost), neither firm will earn any profits. However, if one firm sets price equal to marginal cost, then if the other firm raises its price above unit cost, then it will earn nothing, since all consumers will buy from the firm still setting the competitive price (recall that it is willing to meet unlimited demand at price equals unit cost even though it earns no profit). No other price is an equilibrium. If both firms set the same price above unit cost and share the market, then each firm has an incentive to undercut the other by an arbitrarily small amount and capture the whole market and almost double its profits. So there can be no equilibrium with both firms setting the same price above marginal cost. This is due to the firms competing over goods and services that are considered substitutes; that is, consumers having identical preferences towards each product and only preferring the cheaper of the two. Also, there can be no equilibrium with firms setting different prices. The firms setting the higher price will earn nothing (the lower priced firm serves all of the customers). Hence the higher priced firm will want to lower its price to undercut the lower-priced firm. Hence the only equilibrium in the Bertrand model occurs when both firms set price equal to unit cost (the competitive price).

Note that the Bertrand equilibrium is a weak Nash-equilibrium. The firms lose nothing by deviating from the competitive price: it is an equilibrium simply because each firm can earn no more than zero profits given that the other firm sets the competitive price and is willing to meet all demand at that price.

Classic modelling of the Bertrand competition 
The Bertrand model of price competition in a duopoly market producing homogenous goods has the following characteristics:

 Players: Two firms  with constant marginal cost ;
 Strategic Variables: Firm’s select the price level (i.e.);
 Timing: Simultaneous move game;
 Firm Payoffs: Profit; and
 Information: Complete.

Firm ’s individual demand function is downward sloping and a function of the price set by each firm:

Important to note, in this case, the market demand is continuous; however, the firm's demand is discontinuous, as seen in the above function statement. This means the firm's profit function is also discontinuous. Therefore, firm  aims to maximise its profit, as stated below, taking  as given:

In order to derive the best response for firm , let  be the monopoly price that maximises total industry profit, where . This highlights the incentive for firms to 'undercut' rival firms. As if the rival sets the price at   firm  can reduce its price by the smallest currency unit,  to capture the entire market demand, . Therefore, firm  ’s best response is:
Diagram 1 illustrates firm 1’s best response function, given the price set by firm 2. Note,  in the diagram stands for marginal cost, . The Nash Equilibrium in the Bertrand model is the mutual best response; an equilibrium where neither firm has an incentive to deviate from it. As illustrated in the Diagram 2, the Bertrand-Nash equilibrium occurs when the best response function for both firm’s intersects at the point, where . This means both firms make zero economic profits.

Therefore, if rival prices below marginal cost, firm ends up making losses attracting extra demand and is better of setting price level to marginal cost. Important to note, Bertrand’s model of price competition leads to a perfect competitive outcome. This is known as the Bertrand paradox; as two competitors in a market are sufficient to generate competitive pricing; however, this result is not consistent in many real world industries.

If one firm has lower average cost (a superior production technology), it will charge the highest price that is lower than the average cost of the other one (i.e. a price just below the lowest price the other firm can manage) and take all the business. This is known as "limit pricing".

Critical analysis of the Bertrand model 

The Bertrand model rests on some very extreme assumptions. For example, it assumes that consumers want to buy from the lowest priced firm. There are various reasons why this may not hold in many markets: non-price competition and product differentiation, transport and search costs. For example, would someone travel twice as far to save 1% on the price of their vegetables? The Bertrand model can be extended to include product or location differentiation but then the main result – that price is driven down to marginal cost – no longer holds. With search costs, there may be other equilibria apart from the competitive price – the monopoly price or even price dispersion may be equilibria as in the classic "Bargains and Rip-offs" model.

The model also ignores capacity constraints. If a single firm does not have the capacity to supply the whole market then the "price equals marginal cost" result may not hold. The analysis of this case was started by Francis Ysidro Edgeworth and has become known as the Bertrand–Edgeworth model. With capacity constraints, there may not exist any pure strategy Nash equilibrium, the so-called Edgeworth paradox. However, in general there will exist a mixed-strategy Nash equilibrium as shown by Huw Dixon.

Moreover, some economists have criticized the model as leading to impractical outcomes in situations, where firms have fixed cost  and, as mentioned previously, constant marginal cost, . Hence, the total cost, of producing  units is, . As described in the classic model, prices eventually are driven down to marginal cost, where firms are making zero economic profit and earn no margins on inframarginal units. Thus, firms are not able to recouple any fixed costs. However, if firms have an upward-sloping marginal cost curve, they can earn marginal on infra-marginal sales, which contributes to recouping fixed costs.

There is a big incentive to cooperate in the Bertrand model; colluding to charge the monopoly price, and sharing the market equally, where  is the number of firms in the market. However, not colluding and charging marginal cost is the non-cooperative outcome and the only Nash equilibrium of this model. Therefore, moving from a simultaneous move game to a repeated game with infinite horizon, then collusion is possible because of the Folk Theorem.

Bertrand competition versus Cournot competition
The Bertrand and Cournot model focus on different aspects of the competitive process, which has led to the model identifying different set of mechanisms that vary the characteristics of the market demand that are exhibited by the firms. Cournot model assumes that the market allocates sales equal to whatever any given firm quantity produced, but at the price level determined by the market. Whereas the Bertrand model assumes that the firm with the lowest price acquires all the sales in the market.

When comparing the models, the oligopoly theory suggest that the Bertrand industries are more competitive than Cournot industries. This is because quantities in the Cournot model are considered as strategic substitutes; that is, the increase in quantity level produced by a firm is accommodated by the rival, producing less. Whereas the prices in the Bertrand model are strategic complements; a firm aggressively counters an increase in price level by reducing its price below the rivals.

Moreover, both models are criticised based on the assumptions that are made in comparison to the real-world scenario. However, the results from the classic models can be reconciled in a manner of thinking, as presented below. Considering the models appropriate application in the market:

 Cournot model is applicable in markets where the firm must make production decision in advance and must be committed to selling that quantity level; thus, unlikely to react to fluctuations in rival’s quantity produced.
 Bertrand model is applicable in markets where capacity is sufficiently flexible and firms are capable to meet any market demand that arises at price level, which they set.

Neither model is necessarily "better" than the other. The accuracy of the predictions of each model will vary from industry to industry, depending on the closeness of each model to the industry situation. If capacity and output can be easily changed, Bertrand is generally a better model of duopoly competition. If output and capacity are difficult to adjust, then Cournot is generally a better model.

Under some conditions the Cournot model can be recast as a two-stage model, wherein the first stage firms choose capacities, and in the second they compete in Bertrand fashion.

See also 

 Aggregative game
 Conjectural variation
 Cournot competition
 Differentiated Bertrand competition
 Stackelberg competition
 Nash equilibrium
 Game theory
 Bertrand paradox (economics)
 Bertrand–Edgeworth model
 Edgeworth paradox
 Substitute good

References

Further reading
Oligoply Theory made Simple, Chapter 6 of Surfing Economics by Huw Dixon.
The Pure Theory of Monopoly, Francis Edgeworth
Bertrand's review of Walras and Cournot

Economics models
Competition (economics)
Non-cooperative games
Oligopoly
1883 in economics